Ipomoea sagittifolia is a species of morning glory in the genus Ipomoea. It is native to Africa, India, the Malay Archipelago, and Australia. It was erroneously reported to occur in Taiwan.

Physiology

Alkaloids
It is used in traditional Indian medicine because its seeds contains the indole alkaloids ipobscurine A, B, and C.

References

External links
 

Medicinal plants
sagittifolia
Taxa named by Nicolaas Laurens Burman
Flora of Africa
Flora of Australia
Flora of tropical Asia